Glennonville is an unincorporated community in Dunklin County, in the U.S. state of Missouri.

History
Glennonville was originally built up chiefly by German Catholics.  The community was named after John J. Glennon, the Archbishop of St. Louis. A post office called Glennonville was established in 1907, and remained in operation until 1941.

References

External links
 Map of Glennonville, Missouri from Via Michelin website

Unincorporated communities in Dunklin County, Missouri
Unincorporated communities in Missouri